The 1976 Pittsburgh Panthers football team represented the University of Pittsburgh in the 1976 NCAA Division I football season and is recognized as a consensus national champion. Pitt was also awarded the Lambert-Meadowlands Trophy as the best Division I team in the East. The Panthers played their home games at Pitt Stadium in Pittsburgh, Pennsylvania.

During the 1970s, the top-ranked team won its bowl game only three times: Pittsburgh joined

Schedule

Roster

Coaching staff

Regular season 
The previous season saw Pitt win the Sun Bowl over Kansas for an  record, highlighted by wins at Georgia and Notre Dame. The stage was set for 1976, with Pitt ranked ninth in the AP preseason poll, for the Panthers to make a run for the national championship.

In the first game of the 1976 season, the Panthers faced off against Notre Dame in  South Bend, Indiana. A year earlier, Tony Dorsett had finished with 303 yards rushing in Pitt's 34–20 victory over the Irish. "They even grew the grass high," said Carmen DeArdo, a diehard Pitt alumnus, "and everyone knew Tony would get the ball."  "They didn't let that grass grow long enough," Dorsett said later. He darted 61 yards on his first run of the season and tacked on 120 more by the end of the 31–10 Pitt win.

The season continued with a 42–14 win at Georgia Tech and a 36–19 win over Miami. The Panthers traveled to Annapolis on October 23 to face Navy and Dorsett broke the NCAA career rushing record on a 32-yard touchdown run in the  victory. Dorsett's achievement prompted a mid-game celebration in which even Navy saluted the feat with a cannon blast. Pitt won a tough, hard-fought battle against struggling rival Syracuse.

On November 6, the second-ranked Panthers hosted Army at Pitt Stadium and won handily, but the significant action was taking place several hundred miles west, in West Lafayette, Indiana, where the Purdue Boilermakers held off the top-ranked Michigan Wolverines 16–14 in the closing seconds. The Pitt Stadium crowd erupted in celebration when the stadium public address announcer dramatically gave the final score from Purdue. For the first time in the modern era, Panther fans could legitimately claim, "We're number one!" Pitt defended its ranking in a close Backyard Brawl against West Virginia to go 10–0 heading into the regular season finale on national television against instate rival 

At a packed Three Rivers Stadium on the night after Thanksgiving, the Nittany Lions scored first and held Dorsett to 51 yards in the first half; the game was tied at seven at halftime. Majors adjusted for the second half by shifting Dorsett from tailback to fullback, enabling him to explode for an additional 173 yards as Pitt rolled to a  victory to cap an undefeated regular season.

In December, Dorsett became the first (and remains the only) Pitt Panther to win the Heisman Trophy as the nation's best college football player. Dorsett also won the Maxwell Award, the Walter Camp Player of the Year Award, and was named UPI Player of the Year. He led the nation in rushing with 1,948 yards and was selected as an All-American. Dorsett finished his college career with 6,082 total rushing yards, then an NCAA record for career rushing.

Sugar Bowl
The 11–0 Panthers accepted an invitation to the Sugar Bowl to face fifth-ranked Georgia. Pitt defeated the Bulldogs  and was voted number one by both the Associated Press and Coaches polls, claiming their ninth national championship. This was Pitt's first undefeated national championship since 1937. The American Football Coaches Association (AFCA) named Majors the 1976 Coach of the Year. Following this historic season, Majors returned to his alma mater, the University of Tennessee, to take the head coaching job.

Game summaries

at #11 Notre Dame

at Georgia Tech

Robert Haygood tore knee ligaments in the victory.

Temple

at Duke

Louisville

Matt Cavanaugh sustained a hairline fracture in the left ankle during the first half.

Miami (FL)

at Navy

Syracuse

Army

West Virginia

vs. #16 Penn State

vs. #5 Georgia (Sugar Bowl)

Team players drafted into the NFL

Awards and honors
 Tony Dorsett, Heisman Trophy 
Tony Dorsett, Walter Camp Award
Tony Dorsett, Maxwell Award
Tony Dorsett, led the nation in rushing with 1,948 yards
Tony Dorsett, All-America selection

Media

Radio

References

Further information
 The Year the Panthers Roared. Francis J. Fitzgerald, ed., Louisville, Kentucky, AdCraft Sports, 1996, 
 1976 team where are they now?
 Pitt Magazine article

Pittsburgh
Pittsburgh Panthers football seasons
College football national champions
College football undefeated seasons
Sugar Bowl champion seasons
Lambert-Meadowlands Trophy seasons
Pittsburgh Panthers football